Dan E. Fesman (sometimes credited as Dan Fesman) is a television producer and writer. Fesman graduated from Teaneck High School in Teaneck, New Jersey.

Fesman has also been producer and writer on several recent series, including Grimm, LAX, Wonderfalls and Dead Like Me. He has written for Special Unit 2, Cover Me: Based on the True Life of an FBI Family, Now and Again, The King of Queens, Zero Stress and NCIS.

References

External links

American television producers
American television writers
American male television writers
Living people
Screenwriters from New Jersey
Teaneck High School alumni
Year of birth missing (living people)